Henri Palix (14 November 1864 – 24 May 1936) was a French politician.

Palix was born in Saint-Julien-en-Saint-Alban.  He belonged to the French Workers' Party (POF). He was a member of the Chamber of Deputies from 1898 to 1902.

References

1864 births
1936 deaths
People from Ardèche
Politicians from Auvergne-Rhône-Alpes
French Workers' Party politicians
Members of the 7th Chamber of Deputies of the French Third Republic